World Youth Day (WYD) is an event for young people organized by the Catholic Church that was initiated by Pope John Paul II in 1985. Its concept has been influenced by the Light-Life Movement that has existed in Poland since the 1960s, where during summer camps Catholic young adults over 13 days of camp celebrated a "day of community". For the first celebration of WYD in 1986, bishops were invited to schedule an annual youth event to be held every Palm Sunday in their dioceses. It is celebrated at the diocesan level annually—in most places on Palm Sunday from 1986 to 2020, and from 2021 on Christ the King Sunday—and at the international level every two to three years at different locations. The 1995 World Youth Day closing Mass in the Philippines set a world record for the largest number of people gathered for a single religious event with 5 million attendees— a record surpassed when 6 million attended a Mass celebrated by Pope Francis in the Philippines 20 years later in 2015.

Traditional process 
World Youth Day is commonly celebrated in a way similar to many events. The most emphasized and well known traditional theme is the unity and presence of numerous different cultures. Flags and other national declarations are displayed among mainly young people to show their attendance at the events and proclaim their own themes of Catholicism. Such is usually done through chants and singing of other national songs involving a Catholic theme.

Over the course of the major events taking place, national objects are traded between pilgrims. Flags, shirts, crosses, and other Catholic icons are carried amongst pilgrims which are later traded as souvenirs to other people from different countries of the world. A unity of acceptance among people is also common, with all different cultures coming together to appreciate one another.

Other widely recognized traditions include the Pope's public appearance, commencing with his arrival around the city in the "Popemobile" and then with his final Mass held at the event. A festival in Sydney (2008) recorded an estimated distance of a 10-kilometre walk as roads and other public transport systems were closed off.

Pope Benedict XVI criticized the tendency to view WYD as a kind of rock festival; he stressed that the event should not be considered a "variant of modern youth culture" but as the fruition of a "long exterior and interior path".

History

1987 to 1993 
1987 WYD was held in Buenos Aires, Argentina. 1989 WYD took place in Santiago de Compostela, Spain. 1991 WYD was held in Częstochowa, Poland. 1993 WYD was celebrated in Denver, Colorado, United States.

1995 to 2005 

At WYD 1995, 5 million youths gathered at Luneta Park in Manila, Philippines, an event recognized as the largest crowd ever by the Guinness World Records. In an initial comment immediately following the event, Cardinal Angelo Amato, Prefect of the Congregation for the Causes of Saints, stated that over 4 million people had participated.

1997 WYD was held in Paris, France. 2000 WYD took place in Rome, Italy. 2002 WYD was held in Toronto, Ontario, Canada. 2005 WYD was celebrated in Cologne, Germany. Thomas Gabriel composed for the final Mass on 21 August 2005 the Missa mundi (Mass of the world), representing five continents in style and instrumentation, in a European  influenced by the style of Bach, a South American  with guitars and pan flutes, an Asian  with sitar, an African  with drums, and an Australian  with didgeridoos.

2008 

Sydney, Australia, was chosen as the host of the 2008 World Youth Day celebrations. At the time it was announced in 2005, WYD 2008 was commended by the then Prime Minister of Australia, Kevin Rudd, and the Archbishop of Sydney, Cardinal George Pell. World Youth Day 2008 was held in Sydney, with the Papal Mass held on the Sunday at Randwick Racecourse.

The week saw pilgrims from all continents participate in the Days in the Diocese program hosted by Catholic dioceses throughout Australia and New Zealand. Pope Benedict XVI arrived in Sydney on 13 July 2008 at Richmond Air Force Base. Cardinal Pell celebrated the Opening Mass at Barangaroo (East Darling Harbour) with other activities including the re-enactment of Christ's passion during the Stations of the Cross and the Pope's boat cruise through Sydney Harbour. Pilgrims participated in a variety of youth festivities including visits to St Mary's Cathedral, daily catechesis and Mass led by bishops from around the world, concerts, visits to the tomb of Saint Mary MacKillop, the Vocations Expo at Darling Harbour, reception of the Sacrament of Reconciliation,  and praying before the Blessed Sacrament during Adoration. The Mass and concert at Barangaroo saw an estimated crowd of 150,000.

The event attracted 250,000 foreign visiting pilgrims to Sydney, with an estimated 400,000 pilgrims attending Mass celebrated by Pope Benedict XVI on 20 July.

On 12 June 2008, Xt3.com, a Catholic social online network and news site, was launched as the Official Catholic Social Network of WYD. It was considered to be a direct fruit of WYD08, just as Salt + Light Television was a direct fruit of World Youth Day 2002 in Toronto.
The name was an abbreviation for "Christ in the Third Millennium" and is operated by the Archdiocese of Sydney, with the support of Archbishop Cardinal George Pell. The site was closed in 2019.

In December 2012, the xt3 team produced a 'Gangnam Style' Advent video.

In May 2007, it was reported that Guy Sebastian's song "Receive the Power" had been chosen as official anthem for World Youth Day (WYD08) to be held in Sydney in 2008. The song was co-written by Guy Sebastian and Gary Pinto, with vocals by Paulini.

"Receive the Power" was used extensively throughout the six days of World Youth Day in July 2008 and also in worldwide television coverage.

In November 2008, a 200-page book, Receive the Power, was launched to commemorate World Youth Day 2008.

2011 

Following the celebration of Holy Mass at Randwick Racecourse in Sydney on 20 July 2008, Pope Benedict XVI announced that the next International World Youth Day 2011 would be held in Madrid, Spain. This event was held from 16 to 21 August 2011.

There were nine official patron saints for World Youth Day 2011 in addition to Pope John Paul II: Isidore, John of the Cross, María de la Cabeza, John of Ávila, Teresa of Ávila, Rose of Lima, Ignatius of Loyola, Rafael Arnáiz, and Francis Xavier patron of world missions. During his address to seminarians, Benedict announced that the Spanish mystic and patron of Spanish diocesan clerics St. John of Ávila would become a "Doctor of the Church", a designation granted to only 34 saints throughout the twenty centuries of church history.

An estimated 2,000,000 people attended an all-night vigil to complete the week, more than expected.

2013 

Since 2002, World Youth Day has been held every three years. After the 2011 event the next World Youth Day was scheduled a year earlier than usual, in 2013 in Rio de Janeiro, Brazil, in order to avoid any conflict with the 2014 FIFA World Cup being held in 12 different host cities throughout Brazil and the 2016 Summer Olympics being held in Rio de Janeiro. More than 3 Million catholic youth had gathered for the event from across the world.

2016 

Pope Francis announced at the end of closing Mass for World Youth Day 2013 that Kraków, Poland, would be the venue for World Youth Day 2016. An estimated three million people attended. Young people from many different countries around the world took part in the week-long event which began on 25 July 2016, and ended on 31 July 2016 with an open-air mass led by Pope Francis at Campus Misericordiae where he announced that the next World Youth Day will take place in Panama, Central America in 2019. The theme for this year's World Youth Day was "Blessed Are The Merciful, For They Shall Obtain Mercy", tying in closely with the Year of Mercy, which was initiated by Pope Francis on 8 December 2015 and concluded 20 November 2016.

2019 

At the Concluding Mass for World Youth Day 2016 in Kraków, Pope Francis announced that Panama City would host World Youth Day in 2019. The World Youth Day was held from Tuesday 22 January until Sunday 27 January.

2023 

At the concluding mass in Panama City, Cardinal Kevin Farrell announced that the next World Youth Day will be in Lisbon, Portugal.  Originally scheduled to be held in August 2022, the Holy See announced on 20 April 2020, that it will be postponed until August 2023 due to the COVID-19 pandemic.

Chronology of celebrations 

Note 02This lists languages used in the main international version of the anthem. Local versions of the anthem in other languages (and alternate versions) may have also been produced.

Diocesan

Typical schedule of events

International level

Diocesan level 
At the diocesan level celebrations are decided by a local team usually appointed by the ordinary.

From 1986 to 2020, these celebrations usually occurred during Palm Sunday. They almost always included the Mass of Passion Sunday – when Jesus' entry to Jerusalem in his final days is commemorated. However, on 22 November 2020, Pope Francis has moved the Diocesan Celebration of World Youth Day from Palm Sunday to the Sunday of the Solemnity of Christ the King starting in 2021. Since then, they almost always includes the Mass of the Solemnity of Christ the King of the Universe - the day of the eschatological importance of Jesus.

Music, prayer, reconciliation opportunities, as well as adoration of the Blessed Sacrament may also be part of the celebrations.

See also 
Catholic spirituality
Catholic youth work
Eucharistic Congress
Fellowship of Catholic University Students
International Federation of Catholic Parochial Youth Movements (Fimcap)
International Youth Day
International Youth Year
Juventutem
Life Teen
Universal call to holiness
Vocational Discernment in the Catholic Church
Youth 2000

Notes

References

Further reading 
 Yago de la Cierva, Communication on Church Events. The making of WYD Madrid 2011, Edusc, 2014.
 Juan Narbona, Daniel Arasa, Mass religious events as opportunities for tourism promotion. An analysis of users’ visits to the website of World Youth Day 2016 in Krakow, in Church, Communication and Culture 3 (2018), pp. 379–388.

External links 

 Official World Youth Day website
 Vatican World Youth Day website
 WYD Lisbon 2023
 WYD Sydney 2008 
 WYD Kraków 2016
 WYD Panama 2019
 WYD page from United States Conference of Catholic Bishops
 World Youth Day Photo Slideshows, Themesongs and Small Movie (English/Dutch/German)

 
Youth events
Catholic youth organizations
Pope John Paul II
Recurring events established in 1984
March observances
April observances
May observances
November observances
Christian festivals and holy days
Holidays and observances by scheduling (varies)